Minister of Economy is the person in charge of the Ministry of Economy of Montenegro (Ministarstvo ekonomije). Aleksandar Damjanović is the current Minister of Economy, since 4 December 2020.

Ministers of Economy, since 2006

 Deputy Prime Minister for Economic and Financial Policy

References

Government ministries of Montenegro
2006 establishments in Montenegro
Economy ministries